Rock Master Scott & the Dynamic Three was an old-school hip hop group best known for the singles "Request Line" and "The Roof Is on Fire", both of which have been sampled by many other groups, for a large variety of genres. Rock Master Scott & the Dynamic Three grew up in the Bronx, New York, New York, where three of the members lived in the same building on Webster Avenue.

History
As youngsters, Richard Fowler (a.k.a. Slick Rick; not to be confused with the more famous rapper of the same name) and Gregory Wigfall (a.k.a. MBG or Master Blaster Greg) played sports together, while Charles Pettiford (a.k.a. KingCharlie Prince) preferred to remain indoors playing music. Richard was also into music, and he played drums, mixed music, and belonged to another group; however, this was never known to Charles and MBG (Gregory Wigfall).

Gregory, the photographer, gathered the two together for a show performance in New Haven, Connecticut at a club called Le’ Joint which run by his two cousins Cody and Andre. Richard did not want anything to do with Charles due to the fact they had a previous dispute about his childhood sweetheart. Therefore, he wanted another person name Robert Jones aka Buster B to accompany them. Buster lived in 2000 Valentine Avenue which was the building across from 1985 Webster Avenue. Gregory brought Charles anyway, along with both Richard and Robert. At the New Haven show, they had yet to come up with a group name, so they were just called 'Charlie D and the Crew'. They performed, did well but stayed out there with Gregory's family members for several days and then returned back to New York City where they lived. They then decided to call the group the Devilish Three'. Buster could not continue with the group because he was an MC for another DJ named Smitty Rock and his MC partner name was Charlie Rock so Gregory decided to replace Buster with himself.

They were still called the Devilish Three until they entered a battle at a night club across the street from their building. The club was called Your Spot, formerly known as [Burger King] a fast food restaurant which was converted by a man named Jerry Blood Rock. He made it into a great nightclub for the neighborhood. He needed to get some known MCs to perform there as a grand opening. The Devilish Three was one of the groups he asked. The only problem was they did not have a DJ at the time.

They all knew of a neighborhood DJ known as Kool Dee and since Charles was taught how to mix on the  turntables and scratch records by him, they asked him to see if he could get him to be their DJ for this battle. He agreed, but they never had time to practice with him, and so they end up practicing amongst themselves.

Addition of Rock Master Scott
Although the group won the battle with Kool Dee as their DJ, they felt they needed to get a reliable DJ because he was busy doing other things. That is when they joined with Mark Scott, a.k.a. Master Scott. Now Master Scott was the DJ for another group who was also in that battle.

The group was inspired by other popular groups and they participated in many battles. They started out practicing at Gregory's mother house from time to time, then main spot to practice was then at Richard's mother house. She acted as a mentor and gave great inspiration. They would be rehearsing in her living room while she would sit on the couch watching them, making sure they did it right. She acted as hostess and critic and was involved in their act until her death.

The group started performing with other local groups. They started performing in places like T Connection, Harlem World, also places in New Jersey with other groups such as Sweet, Slick and Sly.

Recordings
Some shows were for a promoter named Armstrong. Scott had a connection with another promoter name Man Dip Lite, who always had shows lined up for other popular groups. He organized gigs for Master Scott & the Dynamic Three at a roller skating rink in Long Island. As time went by Jerry Blood Rock wanted to record the group in the studio. It took some months from the time of him asking them, but finally they recorded their first song, "It's Life (You Gotta Think Twice)" and DJ Wiz Kid was responsible for the music, may he (R.I.P.). This was the first time they had ever seen a recording studio, which was called Unique Recording Studio. Once the song was completed, they waited for about one to two weeks, and Jerry Blood Rock (the song's producer) showed the group the pressing of the records on his record label, Reality Records.

These records were hawked to local record stores. Charlie Prince was working at a record store called Rock N Soul part-time. He convinced the store owner to buy a few boxes. After the group began receiving some radio exposure, Profile Records became involved, particularly for distribution. The group became neighborhood superstars in 1983. In 1984, they recorded the songs "Request Line" and "The Roof Is on Fire", using two different studios. One was Joey Moore's small home studio; Moore was one of Jerry Blood Rock's associates. They laid the track "The Roof Is on Fire" there along with "Request Line" then took it to unique studio to complete the work. 
Once Reality Records released the new music, it was well received.

As the group's popularity increased, shows were booked more often and further away from the group's New York homes. For example, Master Scott and Charlie Prince flew to a performance in Fayetteville, North Carolina while Rick and MBG remained in New Jersey. That is when they met Divine Sounds. Eventually the group performed on a tour called The Jamatron. Other rap artists included Kurtis Blow, Doug E. Fresh, UTFO, Lisa Lisa, Roxanne Shante, Whodini, The Real Roxanne and many others.

Later careers
The Dynamic Three released a subsequent album, Still on Fire, in 2008.

Rock Master Scott, or Mark Scott, is retired in Stewartsville, New Jersey.

Charlie Prince has produced albums for up-and-coming artists such as Sean XLG Mitchell, Murda Mommies and Triple T. He has also released his own music, under the name 'Charlie Prince and the Family'. His albums include From the Dark Womb and Just Matured at It. Charlie Prince also started his I See Entertainment Inc. in 2004, and continues to record in his home studio in Virginia.

Greg Wigfall (MBG) became a Connecticut state trooper in 1985. He has since retired, and is now a photographer/videographer.

Slick Rick confusion
The member of Rock Master Scott & the Dynamic Three known as Slick Rick is not the more famous rapper also known as Slick Rick. The two were rappers at the same time, and both were on the same label, Reality Records, which has only added to the confusion. The Dynamic Three's performer contends that he is the original Slick Rick, as the release date in 1984 of "Request Line" by Rockmaster Scott & the Dynamic Three precedes the release in 1985 of "The Show" by Doug E. Fresh and the Get Fresh Crew, which features MC Ricky D who would eventually use the moniker Slick Rick.

Discography
The group released more than these two songs, but "The Roof Is on Fire" (1984), which charted at #5 on the Billboard Hot Dance Music/Maxi-Singles Sales was the main focus at the time.  The A-side track "Request Line" reached #21 on the Hot R&B/Hip-Hop Singles & Tracks chart.

The phrase and hook from "The Roof Is on Fire" has become more notable than the group itself, having been sampled by groups such as Chemical Brothers, Coal Chamber, Kid 'n Play, Rancid, the Pharcyde, the Bloodhound Gang and many others.

References

External links
 Dynamic Three on Myspace
 
 Hip-hop.net

American hip hop groups
Fantasy Records artists
Profile Records artists